The Communist Party of the Russian Federation faction in the State Duma is the deputy association of the Communist Party of the Russian Federation in the State Duma of the VIII convocation (2021–2026).

In the 2021 elections to the State Duma, the CPRF, according to official data, received 18.94% of the vote, which gave it the right to 48 deputy mandates. 9 people nominated by the party won the elections in single-mandate constituencies. Thus, according to the results of the elections to the State Duma, the Communist Party faction received 57 seats in the State Duma of the VIII convocation.

The voting took place in a tense atmosphere and was accompanied by massive violations of electoral legislation, especially in Moscow, where opposition candidates supported by Smart Voting (Valery Rashkin, Denis Parfenov, Mikhail Lobanov, Anastasia Udaltsova, Sergei Obukhov, Mikhail Tarantsov, as well as representatives of other political forces Anastasia Bryukhanova and Sergey Mitrokhin) were in the lead all three days of voting, but after adding the results of remote electronic voting (DEG) they were defeated in all districts, which significantly reduced the possible representation of the party in the new convocation of the Duma. The Communist Party of the Russian Federation did not recognize the results of the elections in Moscow, demanded that the results of the DEG be canceled as falsified and organized mass protests in the format of meetings with deputies.

On October 7, an organizational meeting of the faction was held, at which Gennady Zyuganov was elected its chairman, and Nikolay Kolomeitsev was elected first deputy chairman.

Activities 
In the election of the Chairman of the State Duma, the faction nominated Dmitry Novikov, who received 61 votes against 360 from the current head of parliament Vyacheslav Volodin. At the same time, in addition to the deputies of the faction, Oksana Dmitriyeva from the Party of Growth and part of the LDPR faction also voted for Novikov: Sergey Karginov, Sergey Leonov, Evgeny Markov, Dmitry Svishchev, Vladimir Sipyagin, Ivan Sukharev and Boris Chernyshov.

On October 14, 2021, the United Russia faction blocked the proposal of the Communist Party faction to conduct a parliamentary investigation into the revealed facts of torture of prisoners.

 96 deputies voted for the proposal of the CPRF (of which 1 deputy of the United Russia faction - Alexander Polyakov, 53 deputies of the CPRF faction, 23 deputies of the A Just Russia — For Truth faction, 12 deputies of the LDPR faction, 7 deputies of the New People faction);
 261 deputies voted against (including 258 deputies of the United Russia faction, 2 deputies of the Communist Party faction - Sergei Gavrilov and Alexander Yushchenko, 1 deputy of the LDPR faction - Ivan Musatov);
 1 deputy abstained (Oksana Dmitriyeva, not a member of the faction).

On November 25, 2021, the deputy from the Communist Party of the Russian Federation Valery Rashkin was deprived of parliamentary immunity.

 341 deputies voted for depriving him of his parliamentary immunity and agreeing to initiate a criminal case against him (including 287 deputies of the United Russia faction, 20 deputies of the A Just Russia faction, 21 deputies of the LDPR faction, 12 deputies of the New People faction and 1 Deputy, not a member of the faction - Yevgeny Marchenko);
 55 deputies voted against (including 54 deputies of the Communist Party faction and 1 deputy of the Just Russia faction - Dmitry Kuznetsov);
 2 deputies abstained (both from the A Just Russia faction - Vadim Belousov and Nikolai Burlyayev).

Composition

8th State Duma

The composition of the faction is indicated in accordance with the official publication of Rossiyskaya Gazeta and the list of deputies on the official website of the State Duma.

References 

8th State Duma of the Russian Federation
Communist Party of the Russian Federation